The Rough Guide to the Music of Zimbabwe is a world music compilation album originally released in 1996. Part of the World Music Network Rough Guides series, it focuses on the music of Zimbabwe, both traditional and modern. The release was compiled by Phil Stanton, co-founder of the World Music Network.

Raymond McKinney of AllMusic rewarded the album with four and a half stars, calling it an "excellent introduction". Michaelangelo Matos, writing for the Chicago Reader, called it repetitious but pleasant, describing the tracks as "nice stuff" that "won't convert anyone."

Track listing

References

External links 
 

1996 compilation albums
World Music Network Rough Guide albums
Compilation albums by Zimbabwean artists
Shona-language albums